Critical thinking is the analysis of available facts, evidence, observations, and arguments to form a judgment. The subject is complex; several different definitions exist, which generally include the rational, skeptical, and unbiased analysis or evaluation of factual evidence. Critical thinking is self-directed, self-disciplined, self-monitored, and self-corrective thinking and accordingly, a critical thinker is one who practices the skills of critical thinking or has been schooled in its disciplines. Richard W. Paul has suggested that the mind of a critical thinker engages both the intellectual abilities and personal traits necessary for critical thinking. Critical thinking presupposes assent to rigorous standards of excellence and mindful command of their use. It entails effective communication and problem-solving abilities as well as a commitment to overcome native egocentrism and sociocentrism.

History

The earliest records of critical thinking are the teachings of Socrates, according to Plato. These included a part in Plato's early dialogues, where Socrates engages with one or more interlocutors on the issue of ethics such as to question whether it was right for Socrates to escape from prison. The philosopher considered and reflected on this question and came to the conclusion that escape violates all the things that he holds higher than himself: the laws of Athens and the guiding voice that Socrates claims to hear.

Socrates established the fact that one cannot depend upon those in "authority" to have sound knowledge and insight. He demonstrated that persons may have power and high position and yet be deeply confused and irrational. Socrates maintained that for an individual to have a good life or to have one that is worth living, he must be a critical questioner and possess an interrogative soul. He established the importance of asking deep questions that probe profoundly into thinking before we accept ideas as worthy of belief.

Socrates established the importance of "seeking evidence, closely examining reasoning and assumptions, analyzing basic concepts, and tracing out implications not only of what is said but of what is done as well". His method of questioning is now known as "Socratic questioning" and is the best known critical thinking teaching strategy. In his mode of questioning, Socrates highlighted the need for thinking for clarity and logical consistency. He asked people questions to reveal their irrational thinking or lack of reliable knowledge. Socrates demonstrated that having authority does not ensure accurate knowledge. He established the method of questioning beliefs, closely inspecting assumptions and relying on evidence and sound rationale. Plato recorded Socrates' teachings and carried on the tradition of critical thinking. Aristotle and subsequent Greek skeptics refined Socrates' teachings, using systematic thinking and asking questions to ascertain the true nature of reality beyond the way things appear from a glance.

Socrates set the agenda for the tradition of critical thinking, namely, to reflectively question common beliefs and explanations, carefully distinguishing beliefs that are reasonable and logical from those that—however appealing to our native egocentrism, however much they serve our vested interests, however comfortable or comforting they may be—lack adequate evidence or rational foundation to warrant belief.

Critical thinking was described by Richard W. Paul as a movement in two waves (1994). The "first wave" of critical thinking is often referred to as
a 'critical analysis' that is clear, rational thinking involving critique. Its details vary amongst those who define it. According to Barry K. Beyer (1995), critical thinking means making clear, reasoned judgments. During the process of critical thinking, ideas should be reasoned, well thought out, and judged. The U.S. National Council for Excellence in Critical Thinking defines critical thinking as the "intellectually disciplined process of actively and skillfully conceptualizing, applying, analyzing, synthesizing, or evaluating information gathered from, or generated by, observation, experience, reflection, reasoning, or communication, as a guide to belief and action."

Etymology and origin of critical thinking
In the term critical thinking, the word critical, (Grk. κριτικός = kritikos = "critic") derives from the word critic and implies a critique; it identifies the intellectual capacity and the means "of judging", "of judgement", "for judging", and of being "able to discern". The intellectual roots of critical thinking are as ancient as its etymology, traceable, ultimately, to the teaching practice and vision of Socrates 2,500 years ago who discovered by a method of probing questioning that people could not rationally justify their confident claims to knowledge.

Definitions
Traditionally, critical thinking has been variously defined as follows:
 "The intellectually disciplined process of actively and skillfully conceptualizing, applying, analyzing, synthesizing, and/or evaluating information gathered from, or generated by, observation, experience, reflection, reasoning, or communication, as a guide to belief and action."
 "Disciplined thinking that is clear, rational, open-minded, and informed by evidence"
 "Purposeful, self-regulatory judgment which results in interpretation, analysis, evaluation, and inference, as well as explanation of the evidential, conceptual, methodological, criteriological, or contextual considerations upon which that judgment is based"
 "Includes a commitment to using reason in the formulation of our beliefs"
 The skill and propensity to engage in an activity with reflective scepticism (McPeck, 1981)
 Thinking about one's thinking in a manner designed to organize and clarify, raise the efficiency of, and recognize errors and biases in one's own thinking. Critical thinking is not 'hard' thinking nor is it directed at solving problems (other than 'improving' one's own thinking). Critical thinking is inward-directed with the intent of maximizing the rationality of the thinker. One does not use critical thinking to solve problems—one uses critical thinking to improve one's process of thinking.
 "An appraisal based on careful analytical evaluation"
 "Critical thinking is a type of thinking pattern that requires people to be reflective, and pay attention to decision-making which guides their beliefs and actions. Critical thinking allows people to deduct with more logic, to process sophisticated information and look at various sides of an issue so they can produce more solid conclusions."
 Critical thinking has seven critical features: being inquisitive and curious, being open-minded to different sides, being able to think systematically, being analytical, being persistent to truth, being confident about critical thinking itself, and lastly, being mature.
 Although critical thinking could be defined in several different ways, there is a general agreement in its key component—the desire to reach for a satisfactory result, and this should be achieved by rational thinking and result-driven manner. Halpern thinks that critical thinking firstly involves learned abilities such as problem-solving, calculation and successful probability application. It also includes a tendency to engage the thinking process. In recent times, Stanovich believed that modern IQ testing could hardly measure the ability of critical thinking.
"Critical thinking is essentially a questioning, challenging approach to knowledge and perceived wisdom. It involves ideas and information from an objective position and then questioning this information in the light of our own values, attitudes and personal philosophy."
Contemporary critical thinking scholars have expanded these traditional definitions to include qualities, concepts, and processes such as creativity, imagination, discovery, reflection, empathy, connecting knowing, feminist theory, subjectivity, ambiguity, and inconclusiveness.  Some definitions of critical thinking exclude these subjective practices.

 According to Ennis, "Critical thinking is the intellectually disciplined process of actively and skillfully conceptualizing, applying, analyzing, synthesizing, and/or evaluating information gathered from, or generated by, observation, experience, reflection, reasoning, or communication, as a guide to belief and action." This definition Ennis provided is highly agreed by Harvey Siegel, Peter Facione, and Deanna Kuhn.
 According to Ennis' definition, critical thinking requires a lot of attention and brain function. When a critical thinking approach is applied to education, it helps the student's brain function better and understand texts differently.
 Different fields of study may require different types of critical thinking. Critical thinking provides more angles and perspectives upon the same material.

Logic and rationality

The study of logical argumentation is relevant to the study of critical thinking. Logic is concerned with the analysis of arguments, including the appraisal of their correctness or incorrectness. In the field of epistemology, critical thinking is considered to be logically correct thinking, which allows for differentiation between logically true and logically false statements.

In "First wave" logical thinking, the thinker is removed from the train of thought, and the analysis of connections between concepts or points in thought is ostensibly free of any bias. In his essay Beyond Logicism in Critical Thinking Kerry S. Walters describes this ideology thus: "A logistic approach to critical thinking conveys the message to students that thinking is legitimate only when it conforms to the procedures of informal (and, to a lesser extent, formal) logic and that the good thinker necessarily aims for styles of examination and appraisal that are analytical, abstract, universal, and objective. This model of thinking has become so entrenched in conventional academic wisdom that many educators accept it as canon". Such principles are concomitant with the increasing dependence on a quantitative understanding of the world.

In the 'second wave' of critical thinking, authors consciously moved away from the logocentric mode of critical thinking characteristic of the 'first wave'. Although many scholars began to take a less exclusive view of what constitutes critical thinking, rationality and logic remain widely accepted as essential bases for critical thinking. Walters argues that exclusive logicism in the first wave sense is based on "the unwarranted assumption that good thinking is reducible to logical thinking".

Deduction, abduction and induction

There are three types of logical reasoning. Informally, two kinds of logical reasoning can be distinguished in addition to formal deduction, which are induction and abduction.

Deduction
 Deduction is the conclusion drawn from the structure of an argument's premises, by use of rules of inference formally those of propositional calculus. For example: X is human and all humans have a face, so X has a face.

Induction
 Induction is drawing a conclusion from a pattern that is guaranteed by the strictness of the structure to which it applies. For example: The sum of even integers is even. Let  then  are even by definition.  , which is even; so summing two even numbers results in an even number.

Abduction
 Abduction is drawing a conclusion using a heuristic that is likely, but not inevitable given some foreknowledge. For example: I observe sheep in a field, and they appear white from my viewing angle, so sheep are white. Contrast with the deductive statement: Some sheep are white on at least one side.

Critical thinking and rationality
Kerry S. Walters, an emeritus philosophy professor from Gettysburg College, argues that rationality demands more than just logical or traditional methods of problem solving and analysis or what he calls the "calculus of justification" but also considers "cognitive acts such as imagination, conceptual creativity, intuition and insight". These "functions" are focused on discovery, on more abstract processes instead of linear, rules-based approaches to problem-solving. The linear and non-sequential mind must both be engaged in the rational mind.

The ability to critically analyze an argument—to dissect structure and components, thesis and reasons—is essential. But so is the ability to be flexible and consider non-traditional alternatives and perspectives. These complementary functions are what allow for critical thinking to be a practice encompassing imagination and intuition in cooperation with traditional modes of deductive inquiry.

Functions
The list of core critical thinking skills includes observation, interpretation, analysis, inference, evaluation, explanation, and metacognition. According to Reynolds (2011), an individual or group engaged in a strong way of critical thinking gives due consideration to establish for instance:
 Evidence through reality
 Context skills to isolate the problem from context
 Relevant criteria for making the judgment well
 Applicable methods or techniques for forming the judgment
 Applicable theoretical constructs for understanding the problem and the question at hand

In addition to possessing strong critical-thinking skills, one must be disposed to engage problems and decisions using those skills. Critical thinking employs not only logic but broad intellectual criteria such as clarity, credibility, accuracy, precision, relevance, depth, breadth, significance, and fairness.

Critical thinking calls for the ability to:
 Recognize problems, to find workable means for meeting those problems
 Understand the importance of prioritization and order of precedence in problem-solving
 Gather and marshal pertinent (relevant) information
 Recognize unstated assumptions and values
 Comprehend and use language with accuracy, clarity, and discernment
 Interpret data, to appraise evidence and evaluate arguments
 Recognize the existence (or non-existence) of logical relationships between propositions
 Draw warranted conclusions and generalizations
 Put to test the conclusions and generalizations at which one arrives
 Reconstruct one's patterns of beliefs on the basis of wider experience
 Render accurate judgments about specific things and qualities in everyday life

In sum:

"A persistent effort to examine any belief or supposed form of knowledge in the light of the evidence that supports or refutes it and the further conclusions to which it tends."

Habits or traits of the mind
The habits of mind that characterize a person strongly disposed toward critical thinking include a desire to follow reason and evidence wherever they may lead, a systematic approach to problem solving, inquisitiveness, even-handedness, and confidence in reasoning.

According to a definition analysis by Kompf & Bond (2001), critical thinking involves problem solving, decision making, metacognition, rationality, rational thinking, reasoning, knowledge, intelligence and also a moral component such as reflective thinking. Critical thinkers therefore need to have reached a level of maturity in their development, possess a certain attitude as well as a set of taught skills.

There is a postulation by some writers that the tendencies from habits of mind should be thought as virtues to demonstrate the characteristics of a critical thinker. These intellectual virtues are ethical qualities that encourage motivation to think in particular ways towards specific circumstances. However, these virtues have also been criticized by skeptics who argue that the evidence is lacking for a specific mental basis underpinning critical thinking.

Research in critical thinking
After undertaking research in schools, Edward M. Glaser proposed in 1941 that the ability to think critically involves three elements:
 An attitude of being disposed to consider in a thoughtful way the problems and subjects that come within the range of one's experiences
 Knowledge of the methods of logical inquiry and reasoning
 Some skill in applying those methods.
Educational programs aimed at developing critical thinking in children and adult learners, individually or in group problem solving and decision making contexts, continue to address these same three central elements.

The Critical Thinking project at Human Science Lab, London, is involved in the scientific study of all major educational systems in prevalence today to assess how the systems are working to promote or impede critical thinking.

Contemporary cognitive psychology regards human reasoning as a complex process that is both reactive and reflective. This presents a problem which is detailed as a division of a critical mind in juxtaposition to sensory data and memory.

The psychological theory disposes of the absolute nature of the rational mind, in reference to conditions, abstract problems and discursive limitations. Where the relationship between critical thinking skills and critical thinking dispositions is an empirical question, the ability to attain causal domination exists, for which Socrates was known to be largely disposed against as the practice of Sophistry. Accounting for a measure of "critical thinking dispositions" is the California Measure of Mental Motivation and the California Critical Thinking Dispositions Inventory. The Critical Thinking Toolkit is an alternative measure that examines student beliefs and attitudes about critical thinking

Education
John Dewey is one of many educational leaders who recognized that a curriculum aimed at building thinking skills would benefit the individual learner, the community, and the entire democracy.

Critical thinking is significant in the learning process of internalization, in the construction of basic ideas, principles, and theories inherent in content.  And critical thinking is significant in the learning process of application, whereby those ideas, principles, and theories are implemented effectively as they become relevant in learners' lives.

Each discipline adapts its use of critical thinking concepts and principles. The core concepts are always there, but they are embedded in subject-specific content. For students to learn content, intellectual engagement is crucial. All students must do their own thinking, their own construction of knowledge. Good teachers recognize this and therefore focus on the questions, readings, activities that stimulate the mind to take ownership of key concepts and principles underlying the subject.

Historically, the teaching of critical thinking focused only on logical procedures such as formal and informal logic. This emphasized to students that good thinking is equivalent to logical thinking. However, a second wave of critical thinking, urges educators to value conventional techniques, meanwhile expanding what it means to be a critical thinker. In 1994, Kerry Walters compiled a conglomeration of sources surpassing this logical restriction to include many different authors' research regarding connected knowing, empathy, gender-sensitive ideals, collaboration, world views, intellectual autonomy, morality and enlightenment. These concepts invite students to incorporate their own perspectives and experiences into their thinking.

In the English and Welsh school systems, Critical Thinking is offered as a subject that 16- to 18-year-olds can take as an A-Level. Under the OCR exam board, students can sit two exam papers for the AS: "Credibility of Evidence" and "Assessing and Developing Argument". The full Advanced GCE is now available: in addition to the two AS units, candidates sit the two papers "Resolution of Dilemmas" and "Critical Reasoning". The A-level tests candidates on their ability to think critically about, and analyze, arguments on their deductive or inductive validity, as well as producing their own arguments. It also tests their ability to analyze certain related topics such as credibility and ethical decision-making. However, due to its comparative lack of subject content, many universities do not accept it as a main A-level for admissions. Nevertheless, the AS is often useful in developing reasoning skills, and the full Advanced GCE is useful for degree courses in politics, philosophy, history or theology, providing the skills required for critical analysis that are useful, for example, in biblical study.

There used to also be an Advanced Extension Award offered in Critical Thinking in the UK, open to any A-level student regardless of whether they have the Critical Thinking A-level. Cambridge International Examinations have an A-level in Thinking Skills.

From 2008, Assessment and Qualifications Alliance has also been offering an A-level Critical Thinking specification.
OCR exam board have also modified theirs for 2008. Many examinations for university entrance set by universities, on top of A-level examinations, also include a critical thinking component, such as the LNAT, the UKCAT, the BioMedical Admissions Test and the Thinking Skills Assessment.

In Qatar, critical thinking was offered by Al-Bairaq - an outreach, non-traditional educational program that targeted high school students and focussed on a curriculum based on STEM fields. The idea behind this was to offer high school students the opportunity to connect with the research environment in the Center for Advanced Materials (CAM) at Qatar University. Faculty members train and mentor the students and help develop and enhance their critical thinking, problem-solving, and teamwork skills.

Effectiveness
In 1995, a meta-analysis of the literature on teaching effectiveness in higher education was undertaken.
The study noted concerns from higher education, politicians, and business that higher education was failing to meet society's requirements for well-educated citizens. It concluded that although faculty may aspire to develop students' thinking skills, in practice they have tended to aim at facts and concepts utilizing lowest levels of cognition, rather than developing intellect or values.

In a more recent meta-analysis, researchers reviewed 341 quasi- or true-experimental studies, all of which used some form of standardized critical thinking measure to assess the outcome variable. The authors describe the various methodological approaches and attempt to categorize the differing assessment tools, which include standardized tests (and second-source measures), tests developed by teachers, tests developed by researchers, and tests developed by teachers who also serve the role as the researcher.  The results emphasized the need for exposing students to real-world problems and the importance of encouraging open dialogue within a supportive environment.  Effective strategies for teaching critical thinking are thought to be possible in a wide variety of educational settings. One attempt to assess the humanities' role in teaching critical thinking and reducing belief in pseudoscientific claims was made at North Carolina State University. Some success was noted and the researchers emphasized the value of the humanities in providing the skills to evaluate current events and qualitative data in context.

Scott Lilienfeld notes that there is some evidence to suggest that basic critical thinking skills might be successfully taught to children at a younger age than previously thought.

Importance in academics
Critical thinking is an important element of all professional fields and academic disciplines (by referencing their respective sets of permissible questions, evidence sources, criteria, etc.). Within the framework of scientific skepticism, the process of critical thinking involves the careful acquisition and interpretation of information and use of it to reach a well-justified conclusion. The concepts and principles of critical thinking can be applied to any context or case but only by reflecting upon the nature of that application. Critical thinking forms, therefore, a system of related, and overlapping, modes of thought such as anthropological thinking, sociological thinking, historical thinking, political thinking, psychological thinking, philosophical thinking, mathematical thinking, chemical thinking, biological thinking, ecological thinking, legal thinking, ethical thinking, musical thinking, thinking like a painter, sculptor, engineer, business person, etc. In other words, though critical thinking principles are universal, their application to disciplines requires a process of reflective contextualization. Psychology offerings, for example, have included courses such as Critical Thinking about the Paranormal, in which students are subjected to a series of cold readings and tested on their belief of the "psychic", who is eventually announced to be a fake.

Critical thinking is considered important in the academic fields for enabling one to analyze, evaluate, explain, and restructure thinking, thereby ensuring the act of thinking without false belief. However, even with knowledge of the methods of logical inquiry and reasoning, mistakes occur, and due to a thinker's inability to apply the methodology consistently, and because of overruling character traits such as egocentrism. Critical thinking includes identification of prejudice, bias, propaganda, self-deception, distortion, misinformation, etc. Given research in cognitive psychology, some educators believe that schools should focus on teaching their students critical thinking skills and cultivation of intellectual traits.

Critical thinking skills can be used to help nurses during the assessment process. Through the use of critical thinking, nurses can question, evaluate, and reconstruct the nursing care process by challenging the established theory and practice. Critical thinking skills can help nurses problem solve, reflect, and make a conclusive decision about the current situation they face. Critical thinking creates "new possibilities for the development of the nursing knowledge". Due to the sociocultural, environmental, and political issues that are affecting healthcare delivery, it would be helpful to embody new techniques in nursing. Nurses can also engage their critical thinking skills through the Socratic method of dialogue and reflection. This practice standard is even part of some regulatory organizations such as the College of Nurses of Ontario's Professional Standards for Continuing Competencies (2006).
It requires nurses to engage in Reflective Practice and keep records of this continued professional development for possible review by the college.

Critical thinking is also considered important for human rights education for toleration. The Declaration of Principles on Tolerance adopted by UNESCO in 1995 affirms that "education for tolerance could aim at countering factors that lead to fear and exclusion of others, and could help young people to develop capacities for independent judgement, critical thinking and ethical reasoning".

Online communication
The advent and rising popularity of online courses have prompted some to ask if computer-mediated communication (CMC) promotes, hinders, or has no effect on the amount and quality of critical thinking in a course (relative to face-to-face communication). There is some evidence to suggest a fourth, more nuanced possibility: that CMC may promote some aspects of critical thinking but hinder others. For example, Guiller et al. (2008) found that, relative to face-to-face discourse, online discourse featured more justifications, while face-to-face discourse featured more instances of students expanding on what others had said. The increase in justifications may be due to the asynchronous nature of online discussions, while the increase in expanding comments may be due to the spontaneity of 'real-time' discussion. Newman et al. (1995) showed similar differential effects. They found that while CMC boasted more important statements and linking of ideas, it lacked novelty. The authors suggest that this may be due to difficulties participating in a brainstorming-style activity in an asynchronous environment. Rather, the asynchrony may promote users to put forth "considered, thought out contributions".

Researchers assessing critical thinking in online discussion forums often employ a technique called Content Analysis, where the text of online discourse (or the transcription of face-to-face discourse) is systematically coded for different kinds of statements relating to critical thinking. For example, a statement might be coded as "Discuss ambiguities to clear them up" or "Welcoming outside knowledge" as positive indicators of critical thinking. Conversely, statements reflecting poor critical thinking may be labeled as "Sticking to prejudice or assumptions" or "Squashing attempts to bring in outside knowledge". The frequency of these codes in CMC and face-to-face discourse can be compared to draw conclusions about the quality of critical thinking.

Searching for evidence of critical thinking in discourse has roots in a definition of critical thinking put forth by Kuhn (1991), which emphasizes the social nature of discussion and knowledge construction. There is limited research on the role of social experience in critical thinking development, but there is some evidence to suggest it is an important factor. For example, research has shown that 3- to 4-year-old children can discern, to some extent, the differential creditability and expertise of individuals. Further evidence for the impact of social experience on the development of critical thinking skills comes from work that found that 6- to 7-year-olds from China have similar levels of skepticism to 10- and 11-year-olds in the United States. If the development of critical thinking skills was solely due to maturation, it is unlikely we would see such dramatic differences across cultures.

See also

References

Further reading

Books
 
 Damer, T. Edward. (2005) Attacking Faulty Reasoning, 6th Edition, Wadsworth. 
 Dauer, Francis Watanabe. Critical Thinking: An Introduction to Reasoning, 1989, 
 Fisher, Alec and Scriven, Michael. (1997) Critical Thinking: Its Definition and Assessment, Center for Research in Critical Thinking (UK) / Edgepress (US). 
 Hamby, B.W. (2007) The Philosophy of Anything: Critical Thinking in Context, Kendall Hunt Publishing Company, Dubuque Iowa. 
 Vincent F. Hendricks. (2005) Thought 2 Talk: A Crash Course in Reflection and Expression, New York: Automatic Press / VIP. 
  (a.k.a. Weaponized Lies: How to Think Critically in the Post-Truth Era)
 Moore, Brooke Noel and Parker, Richard. (2012) Critical Thinking. 10th ed. Published by McGraw-Hill. .
 Paul, Richard. (1995) Critical Thinking: How to Prepare Students for a Rapidly Changing World. 4th ed. Foundation for Critical Thinking. .
 Paul, Richard and Elder, Linda. (2006) Critical Thinking Tools for Taking Charge of Your Learning and Your Life, New Jersey: Prentice Hall Publishing. .
 Sagan, Carl. (1995) The Demon-Haunted World: Science As a Candle in the Dark. Ballantine Books. 
 Theodore Schick & Lewis Vaughn "How to Think About Weird Things: Critical Thinking for a New Age" (2010)  
 van den Brink-Budgen, R (2010) Critical Thinking for Students, How To Books. 
 Whyte, J. (2003) Bad Thoughts – A Guide to Clear Thinking, Corvo. .
David Carl Wilson (2020) A Guide to Good Reasoning: Cultivating Intellectual Virtues (2nd edition) University of Minnesota Libraries  Ebook   Creative Commons Attribution-Non-Commercial 4.0 International License, at https://open.lib.umn.edu/goodreasoning/
 Zeigarnik, B.V. (1927). "On finished and unfinished tasks". In English translation Edited by Willis D. Ellis; with an introduction by Kurt Koffka. (1997). A source book of Gestalt psychology, xiv, 403 p. : ill.; 22 cmHighland, N.Y: Gestalt Journal Press. "This Gestalt Journal Press edition is a verbatim reprint of the book as originally published in 1938" – T.p. verso.  .

Articles
  - See at ResearchGate
 Facione, P. 2007. Critical Thinking: What It Is and Why It Counts – 2007 Update
 Kompf, M., & Bond, R. (2001). Critical reflection in adult education. In T. Barer-Stein & M. Kompf(Eds.), The craft of teaching adults (pp. 21–38). Toronto, ON: Irwin.
 McPeck, J. (1992). Thoughts on subject specificity. In S. Norris (Ed.), The generalizability of critical thinking (pp. 198–205). New York: Teachers College Press.
 
 
 
 Twardy, Charles R. (2003) Argument Maps Improve Critical Thinking. Teaching Philosophy 27:2 June 2004.

External links 

 
 
 
 
 
 
 Critical Thinking: What Is It Good for? (In Fact, What Is It?) by Howard Gabennesch, Skeptical Inquirer magazine.
 Glossary of Critical Thinking Terms
 Critical Thinking Web

 
 
A priori
Abstraction
Accountability
Analysis
Arguments
Autonomy
Causal inference
Cognition
Critical theory
Deductive reasoning
Empiricism
Epistemological theories
Epistemology of science
Evaluation
Inductive reasoning
Knowledge representation
Learning
Logical consequence
Mental content
Mental processes
Metaphysical theories
Metaphysics of mind
Morality
Observation
Ontology
Perception
Rationalism
Scientific method
Skepticism
Social concepts
Thought
Truth
Virtue